Calvin Howard Taylor (March 14, 1896 – after 1951) was a politician in Ontario, Canada. He represented Timiskaming in the Legislative Assembly of Ontario from 1943 to 1951 as a Co-operative Commonwealth Federation (CCF) member.

The son of John Taylor and Elizabeth Payne, he was born in Madawaska and was educated there and in Renfrew. In 1917, Taylor married Catherine Hamilton. He was chief clerk for the Temiskaming and Northern Ontario Railway. Taylor was mayor of Cobalt for four years.

References 

1896 births
Year of death missing
Ontario Co-operative Commonwealth Federation MPPs
20th-century Canadian politicians
Mayors of places in Ontario